General Ward may refer to:

United Kingdom
Alfred Dudley Ward (1905–1991), British Army general
Francis Ward (British Army officer) (1840–1919), British Army major general
Philip Ward (1924–2003), British Army major general
Richard Ward (British Army officer) (1917–1989), British Army general
Robert Ward (British Army officer) (born 1935), British Army major general

United States
Artemas Ward (1727–1800), Continental Army major general 
Durbin Ward (1819–1886), Union Army brevet brigadier general
H. Marshal Ward (born 1946), U.S. Air Force major general
J. H. Hobart Ward (1823–1903), U.S. Army brigadier general
Leonard C. Ward (1917–2001), U.S. Army brigadier general
Orlando Ward (1891–1972), U.S. Army major general
William E. Ward (born 1949), U.S. Army four-star general
William F. Ward Jr. (1928–2018), U.S. Army major general
William Thomas Ward (1808–1878), Union Army brigadier general

Other
Frederick Townsend Ward (1831–1862), American-born Qing Imperial Army general

See also
Anthony Ward-Booth (1927–2002), British Army major general
John Ward-Harrison (1918–1985), British Army major general
George Warde (1725–1803), British Army general
Attorney General Ward (disambiguation)